Samuel Balter Jr. (October 15, 1909 – August 8, 1998) was an American basketball player who won a gold medal at the 1936 Summer Olympics. He was also a renowned sportscaster.

Career
Balter was born in Detroit, Michigan. He attended Lincoln High School, and then Roosevelt High School, both in Los Angeles. In his college years, he attended UCLA, where he played basketball and was an NCAA All-American.  He also played for an amateur basketball team sponsored by Universal Pictures.

He competed in the 1936 Summer Olympics. As a Jew, he had some hesitation about playing in the Olympics hosted by Hitler's Germany, but was persuaded when he was assured by Avery Brundage that there would be no Nazi propaganda at the games.  The Nazi regime had passed the anti-Semitic Nuremberg laws the prior Fall which stripped German Jews of citizenship, opportunities to receive a public education, and access to many professions and public facilities.  Jewish businesses had been boycotted and Jews could not serve in the legal profession, the civil service, teach in secondary schools or universities or vote or hold public office.

Balter was part of the American basketball team which won the gold medal. He played in two matches, but not the final match in which the U.S. team won the gold medal. He was one of a number of Jewish athletes who won medals at the Nazi Olympics in Berlin in 1936. The Berlin Olympic final concluded the first official Olympic Basketball competition, with the United States defeating Canada, 19-8.  At the games, the medals were awarded by James Naismith, the inventor of basketball. The game was low scoring, as it was played outdoors in a converted tennis stadium with clay courts that had become somewhat muddy after a heavy rain, making dribbling and ball handling difficult.  Irving Maretsky, a Canadian competitor, noted that the American's height advantage was a key component in their victory, as at the time the rules required each score to be followed by a jump at center court and made rapid passing and dribbling difficult. 

Balter later turned his celebrity into a career as a Los Angeles sportscaster, announcing at radio station KLAC from 1946 to 1962, and starting his TV career on a local station in 1950. He was known as the "voice of UCLA football and basketball" and also wrote sports columns for the Los Angeles Herald-Express.

Balter was the broadcast announcer for the Los Angeles Stars of the American Basketball Association before the ABA-NBA merger. He also appeared in a number of movies and television shows, always portraying a radio announcer or sportscaster.

Balter is a member of the Amateur Athletic Union (AAU) Hall of Fame, the International Jewish Sports Hall of Fame, the Southern California Broadcasters Hall of Fame, the Southern California Jewish Sports Hall of Fame, and the UCLA Athletic Hall of Fame.

Personal life
Balter was married and had a daughter. He died as a result of complications from abdominal surgery on August 8, 1998.

Filmography
 Straightaway (1961–1962), two episodes

See also
List of select Jewish basketball players

References

External links
Olympics Profile
Sam Balter at Jewish Sports Hall of Fame

1909 births
1998 deaths
Amateur Athletic Union men's basketball players
American Basketball Association announcers
American men's basketball players
Basketball players at the 1936 Summer Olympics
Basketball players from Detroit
Cincinnati Reds announcers
College basketball announcers in the United States
Forwards (basketball)
Jewish American sportspeople
Jewish men's basketball players
Los Angeles Stars
Los Angeles Rams announcers
Major League Baseball broadcasters
Medalists at the 1936 Summer Olympics
Minor League Baseball broadcasters
Olympic gold medalists for the United States in basketball
UCLA Bruins football announcers
UCLA Bruins men's basketball players
United States men's national basketball team players
20th-century American Jews